The Stadion am Bieberer Berg was a multi-purpose stadium in Offenbach am Main, Germany. The stadium was built in 1921 and held 26,500 people. Situated between Offenbach and the village Bieber it was the home of the club Kickers Offenbach  but has now been replaced  by the Sparda-Bank-Hessen-Stadion.

David Bowie performed at the old stadium during his Serious Moonlight Tour on 24 June 1983 and during his Earthling Tour on 8 June 1997.

External links 

 Bieberer Berg 

Football venues in Germany
Stadion am Bieberer Berg
Stadion am Bieberer Berg
Stadion am Bieberer Berg
Multi-purpose stadiums in Germany
Sports venues in Hesse
Sports venues completed in 1921